The Kaundinya River is a non-perennial river and tributary of the Palar River flowing in the Chittoor district of Andhra Pradesh and Vellore district of Tamil Nadu.

References

See also 
List of rivers of Tamil Nadu

Rivers of Tamil Nadu
Rivers of India

ta:கௌண்டின்ய நதி (ஆறு)